Michael Cory Doyne (born August 13, 1981) is an American former professional baseball pitcher. He played in Major League Baseball (MLB) for the Baltimore Orioles.
Height 5’8

Career highlights
He spent most of the  season with the Triple-A Norfolk Tides. He made his major league debut on June 16, 2007, (although the official Orioles website states that his contract was not purchased until the next day). He was then optioned back to Triple-A on June 19. His latest call-up was on July 25, when he took Chris Ray's place on the roster, after Ray was placed on the DL.

Doyne's major league debut was June 16, 2007, against the Arizona Diamondbacks at Oriole Park at Camden Yards. The first batter he faced was Conor Jackson, who was also the first walk he surrendered in his career (on five pitches). His first out recorded came against the very next batter, as Arizona second baseman Orlando Hudson grounded the 7th pitch of the at-bat to second, and was retired 4–3.

His first career strike out came in his second Major League game (also at Camden Yards) on July 25, 2007, against the Tampa Bay Devil Rays. Carl Crawford, the first batter Doyne faced in the game, swung and missed on the fourth pitch of the at-bat. Doyne retired the next two batters on fly balls, turning in the first complete inning of his career.

The first earned run he surrendered came the next night, also against the Devil Rays. Doyne came on to pitch in the 9th inning, and walked Brendan Harris to begin the inning (his second career walk). Harris moved over to third base on a single by catcher Raul Casanova, and scored on a sacrifice fly off the bat of Akinori Iwamura. Casanova would later score Doyne's second career earned run on a single by Greg Norton, but Doyne would complete the inning, and the Orioles won the game by a score of 10–7.

On June 3, 2009, Doyne signed a Minor League deal with the Washington Nationals.

External links

1981 births
Living people
Aberdeen IronBirds players
Baltimore Orioles players
Baseball players from Tampa, Florida
Fort Wayne Wizards players
Frederick Keys players
Gulf Coast Orioles players
Lexington Legends players
Long Island Ducks players
Major League Baseball pitchers
Martinsville Astros players
Memphis Redbirds players
Michigan Battle Cats players
New Jersey Cardinals players
Norfolk Tides players
Palm Beach Cardinals players
Springfield Cardinals players
Surprise Scorpions players
Swing of the Quad Cities players
Syracuse Chiefs players
Tiburones de La Guaira players
American expatriate baseball players in Venezuela